Maryam Mojtahedzadeh is an Iranian nurse, educator and conservative politician who was formerly Vice President of Iran under Mahmoud Ahmadinejad. She is currently head of Organization for Preserving Values and Publications of Women's Participation in Sacred Defence of General Staff of Armed Forces of the Islamic Republic of Iran.

References

1957 births
Living people
People from Sari, Iran
Female wartime nurses
Female vice presidents of Iran
Vice presidents of Iran for Women and Family Affairs
Tarbiat Modares University alumni
University of Georgia alumni
Persian nurses
Women vice presidents
21st-century Iranian women politicians
21st-century Iranian politicians